The herring is a type of fish. The term may also refer to herring as food.

Herring or Herrings may also refer to:


People and fictional characters 
 Herring (surname)
 Herring Shangpliang, Indian football head coach and former player

Places

United States 
 Herring, Iowa, a ghost town
 Herrings, New York
 Herring, West Virginia, an unincorporated community
 Herring Bay, Maryland

Antarctica 
 Herring Nunataks
 Herring Point

Multiple 
 Herring Island (disambiguation)

Military 
 Operation Herring, the last World War II combat air drop in Europe
 , a World War II submarine
 , several Royal Navy ships

Other uses 
 Herring Bank, a bank based in Amarillo, Texas
 Herring Hotel, Belle Plaine, Iowa, on the National Register of Historic Places
 Herring Motor Car Company Building, Polk County, Iowa, on the National Register of Historic Places

See also 
 Red herring (disambiguation)
 Battle of the Herrings, a 1429 battle in France